Bronisław Gosztyła (11 October 1935 — 18 October 1991) was a Polish ice hockey player. He played for KTH Krynica and Legia Warsaw during a career that lasted from 1949 until 1968. He also played for the Polish national team at several world championships as well as the 1956 and 1964 Winter Olympics. He won the Polish hockey league championship seven times in his career.

References

External links
 

1935 births
1991 deaths
Ice hockey players at the 1956 Winter Olympics
Ice hockey players at the 1964 Winter Olympics
KTH Krynica players
Legia Warsaw (ice hockey) players
Olympic ice hockey players of Poland
People from Krynica-Zdrój
Polish ice hockey forwards